Hardon is a surname. Notable people with the surname include:

John Hardon (1914–2000), Jesuit priest, writer, and theologian
Joy Hardon (1921–2016), Australian fencer

See also
Hadron, a type of composite particle in physics
Hard-Ons, an Australian punk rock band
Erection of the penis, colloquially called a "hard-on"